Dominique Dunois, pen name of Marguerite Lemesle was a French writer, winner of the 1928 edition of the Prix Femina.

Works 

1923: L'Épouse - Calmann-Lévy
1924: Le Faune - Calmann-Lévy
1925: Lucile, cœur éperdu - Calmann-Lévy
1926: Le Pauvre Désir des hommes, collection of short stories - Calmann-Lévy
1926: L'Amant synthétique - Calmann-Lévy
1927: Leurs deux visages - Calmann-Lévy
1928: Georgette Garou - Calmann-Lévy, Prix Femina.
1929: Le Bourgeois au calvaire - Fresque des temps nouveaux - Calmann-Lévy
1931: La Belle Journée - Calmann-Lévy
1932: Suspicion - Flammarion
1933: Le Second des Berthault - Flammarion

References

Year of birth missing
Year of death missing
20th-century French novelists
Prix Femina winners
Writers from Paris
20th-century French women writers